Castellfort is a municipality located in the province of Castellón, Valencian Community, Spain.

Notable people
 María Egual (1655-1735), poet and dramatist; marchioness of Castellfort

Municipalities in the Province of Castellón
Ports (comarca)